The Yardbirds were an English rock group that had a string of Top 40 radio hits in mid-1960s in the UK and the US and introduced guitarists Eric Clapton, Jeff Beck, and Jimmy Page.  Their first album released in the UK, Five Live Yardbirds (1964), represented their early club performances with Clapton.  The Yardbirds' first American album, For Your Love (1965), was released to capitalise on their first hit, and to promote the group's first US tour.  However, Clapton had already decided to pursue a different musical direction and was replaced by Beck.  Several popular singles with Beck followed, including a second American album, Having a Rave Up with the Yardbirds (1965), that, as with their previous album, was a split release featuring songs with both Clapton and Beck.

In 1966, the Yardbirds recorded their first studio album of all original material.  Released in the UK as Yardbirds and in the US as Over Under Sideways Down, the album acquired the nickname "Roger the Engineer" after a caption on the English cover drawn by rhythm guitarist Chris Dreja.  Shortly after its release, bassist Paul Samwell-Smith left the group and was replaced by Page.  Page soon switched to second lead guitar, with Dreja taking over on bass.  This lineup only produced two songsthe psychedelic "Happenings Ten Years Time Ago" (1966), which was the group's last song to reach the charts in the UK, and "Stroll On", the proto-heavy metal remake of "Train Kept A-Rollin'" they performed for the film Blowup (1966).

The dual lead lineup with Beck and Page did not last long; Beck had become increasingly unhappy with the constant touring and left the group, with Page remaining as the sole guitarist.  The period as a quartet with Page was the Yardbirds' most stable and lasted nearly two and a half years.  In the US, they continued to release singles and an album, Little Games (1967). The records, overseen by pop producer Mickie Most, were mostly out-of-step with the audience's shift to an album-oriented, more diverse sound. However, the Yardbirds' frequent concert appearances at counter-culture venues were well-received. They were able to perform more experimental fare, such as "Dazed and Confused", the Page solo acoustic guitar piece "White Summer", and expanded, reworked versions and medleys of some of their earlier songs, as documented on the Page-produced Yardbirds '68 (2017).   After a last American tour, the group disbanded in the summer of 1968.

Since their breakup, a number of new albums have appeared.  Besides numerous anthologies, albums featuring additional live recordings and various demos and outtakes from 1963–1968 have been released. Although some have received favourable reviews, music critic Richie Unterberger has noted the great number of substandard releases throughout the world.  In 1994, original drummer Jim McCarty and rhythm guitarist Chris Dreja began performing and recording as the Yardbirds. Recordings with various singers and guitarists have been released.

Original 1964–1968 releases
The Yardbirds were signed to EMI and their records were released through the Columbia Graphophone Company in the UK and Epic Records in the US. In other countries, the group's releases were handled by a variety of labels, including affiliates of Columbia and Epic, Capitol (Canada), Riviera (France), Ricordi International (Italy), Odeon (Japan), and CBS (international). Sometimes, Yardbirds' records appeared on several labels in the same territory (in Germany, there were releases by Columbia, Epic, and CBS) and were reconfigured from the original UK and US records.

Albums
In their native UK, Columbia only issued two albums during the Yardbirds' career, Five Live Yardbirds (1964) and Yardbirds, popularly referred to as "Roger the Engineer" (1966). For Epic in the US, Yardbirds' manager Giorgio Gomelsky produced two albums, For Your Love (1965) and Having a Rave Up with the Yardbirds (1965), which were collections of new material mixed in with singles and live recordings featuring both Clapton and Beck. Epic subsequently issued Over Under Sideways Down (the US reconfiguration of Yardbirds, 1966), The Yardbirds' Greatest Hits (1967), and the Mickie Most-produced Little Games (1967). Reconfigurations of the Epic For Your Love were released in Canada (Capitol's Heart Full of Soul) and other countries. All albums were released on 12-inch 33⅓ rpm LP records. Where two catalogue numbers are given, the album was released in monaural and stereo versions, otherwise it is mono only.

Other album appearances
In an early bid to promote the group, manager Gomelsky arranged for the Yardbirds to serve as backing musicians for a British tour by American bluesman Sonny Boy Williamson II. Recordings during the 1963–1964 tour were later released in 1966, after the Yardbirds had a string of Top 40 hits. In 1966, after Page joined the group, the Yardbirds contributed a remake of "Train Kept A-Rollin'", titled "Stroll On", for the Michelangelo Antonioni film Blow-up (1966). In 1967, MGM Records issued the soundtrack album.

Singles
In the UK, singles were the only source of many of the Yardbirds' songs, until the first anthology albums were released in the 1970s.  In the US, these were usually included on albums.  Two singles released in Germany and Italy in 1966 remained unavailable on album until the 1980–1990s compilations by Charly Records. The last three Epic singles (unreleased in the UK) did not appear on an album until the 1991 expanded Little Games Sessions and More album.  All singles and extended play (EPs) were released on 7-inch 45 rpm records.

Releases after 1969
A large number of Yardbirds anthologies of recordings originally produced by their first manager Gomelsky have been issued by numerous record companies over the years. These do not include songs recorded with other producers after March 1966, such as "Over Under Sideways Down", "Happenings Ten Years Time Ago", and  "Little Games".  Often, the albums are a haphazard mix of studio and live recordings from the Clapton and early Beck eras.  Music critic Richie Unterberger wrote:

However, a few early Epic anthologies and the Rhino Records set Ultimate! (2001) managed to cross license material from the different producers. Many albums of live recordings focusing on performances with Clapton or Beck have appeared and, in 2017, the Page-produced Yardbirds '68 was released. One studio album and several live albums recorded by the post-1999 reconstituted Yardbirds have been issued.

Videos

Other charts

Notes
Footnotes

Citations

References

External links

Discographies of British artists
Rock music group discographies
Discography